Chunian , is an administrative subdivision (tehsil) of Kasur District in the Punjab province of Pakistan. The city of Chunian is the headquarters of the tehsil.

Administration
The tehsil of Chunian is administratively subdivided into 27 Union Councils, these are:

Bhagiwal
Changa Manga
Chak No 13
Chak No 18
 Chunian-1
 Chunian-2
Deo Sial
Dhuttay
Gehlan Hithar
Jaguwala
Jajjal
Jamsher alan
Jamsher Khurd
Jand Wala
Kanganpur
  Kanganpur (Rural)
Allahabad
Kot Sandress
kotha
Kull
Lunday
Maujoki
Mokal
Mulapur
Mundayki
Sadda
Talwandi
Wan Khara
Umme Pur

See also
Chunian
Changa Manga
Kasur District

References

Kasur District
Tehsils of Punjab, Pakistan